Jeffrey John "Jeff" Parton (born 24 February 1953) is a Welsh retired professional footballer who played as a goalkeeper. He won three caps for the Welsh under-23 team.

References

1953 births
Living people
Footballers from Swansea
Welsh footballers
Wales under-23 international footballers
Association football goalkeepers
Burnley F.C. players
Northampton Town F.C. players
English Football League players